Cri De Coeur or Cri du coeur may refer to:

Cri De Coeur, a 2003 album by Sonja Kristina
Cri De Coeur, a Hugo Award-nominated short story by Michael Bishop
Cri De Coeur, a newsletter by Jeunesse Militante, the youth wing of Mouvement Militant Mauricien
Le Cri du coeur, the French title of the French language film The Heart's Cry
"Cri de Coeur", an episode of the third season of Netflix series The Crown